Männiku (Estonian for "Pine Grove") is a subdistrict in the district of Nõmme, Tallinn, the capital of Estonia.

Gallery

See also
Männiku training area

References

Subdistricts of Tallinn